Nine Lashes is an American Christian rock band from Birmingham, Alabama formed in 2006. They independently released their first album, Escape, in 2009 before Trevor McNevan of Thousand Foot Krutch brought them to the attention of Tooth & Nail Records. Upon signing to the label, the band recorded their second album World We View and released it on February 14, 2012. The album sold well, making several Billboard charts. The band released their third album, From Water to War on January 21, 2014. After a change in direction, the band released their fourth album, the electronica and Christian rock styled Ascend on March 11, 2016.

History
The band was formed in 2006 around founding members guitarist Adam "Tank" Jefferson and original drummer Keith Cunningham, who had played together in another band for several years prior. Jared "Gus" Lankford and Adam's brother Jon Jefferson joined as bassist and guitarist, and lead singer Jeremy Dunn joined in 2007 after the band's original vocalist got married and decided to settle down. During this early period, the band opened for Day of Fire at Life Church in Trussville, Alabama, was interviewed on WDJC-FM, and worked extensively with the organization Teen Challenge. On June 5, 2009, the band independently released their debut album Escape with producer Travis Wyrick on Collide Records.

In the first of a series of events Dunn later described as "completely a God thing", the band was hoping to increase their visibility via a performance at Gardendale, Alabama's annual Magnolia Festival. To this end, Jon sent a copy of Escape to Joe Posey, the festival's promoter. Posey liked the album and decided to attend one of the band's concerts to see if they could play live. Even more impressed by the band's live performance, he forwarded his copy of Escape along with a recommendation to his longtime friend Trevor McNevan, himself a well-known musician and producer. Recovering at home from a ruptured appendix, McNevan was able to hear the album despite his busy schedule, shared Posey's enthusiasm, and passed the album on to Brandon Ebel, president and CEO of Tooth & Nail Records (to which McNevan's own bands Thousand Foot Krutch and FM Static were signed). This resulted in Nine Lashes signing with the label, which was officially announced on June 27, 2011.

Later in 2011, Nine Lashes was selected to join I Am Empire and Blood and Water on the former's Kings and Queens Tour, replacing original co-headliners Queens Club, who had ended up disbanding before the tour started. They also joined the American leg of Red's REDvolution tour in February and March 2012, and are scheduled to play at the annual Creation Northwest and Kingdom Bound festivals in the summer.

The band's second album, World We View, was released on February 14, 2012. The album was co-produced by McNevan and Aaron Sprinkle and featured guest vocals from McNevan and Demon Hunter frontman Ryan Clark. In the week of March 3, 2012, the album debuted on Billboard and peaked at No. 17 on the Christian Albums chart, No. 5 on Top Heatseekers, No. 13 on Top Hard Rock Albums, and No. 43 on Top Rock Albums.

The band announced their "From Water" tour on August 9, 2013, to support their new album, From Water to War, which was released on January 21, 2014.  On October 29, they released a new single titled "Break the World"  and soon after released "Surrender" - both early releases from their new album. In an interview with CCM Magazine, Dunn stated: "We really pushed ourselves to add to our sound with this album. We really wanted to take the digital aspect of our sound from the last album, like the 'Anthem [of the Lonely]' intro or 'The Intervention,' and expand upon it. I think we ended up with a really well-rounded album."

The band's fourth album, Ascend, was released on March 11, 2016. The album largely abandons the group's hard rock sound in favor of EDM and dubstep-inspired music. However, seven singles released between 2018 and 2021 show a return to hard rock.

Members 

Current
 Jeremy Dunn — lead vocals
 Jonathan David Jefferson — guitar, bass
 Joseph Andrew Jefferson — guitar, bass
 Noah Terrell — drums
 Adam "Tank" Jefferson — guitar
 Jared Lankford — bass

Past
 Keith Cunningham — drums

Discography

Albums

Singles

Music videos

References

External links 
 
 Nine Lashes at Tooth and Nail's official website
 Nine Lashes at Jesus Freak Hideout

Musical groups established in 2006
Heavy metal musical groups from Alabama
Tooth & Nail Records artists
Christian alternative metal groups
American post-grunge musical groups
American alternative metal musical groups
Musical groups from Birmingham, Alabama
Alternative rock groups from Alabama
American Christian rock groups